Circaea × mentiens is a hybrid of flowering plants in the evening primrose family Onagraceae. The parents of the hybrid are Circaea alpina and Circaea erubescens.

References

mentiens
Plant nothospecies